Buffett is a surname of English origin. It was first recorded in Shropshire in 1273 where it was listed on the Hundred Rolls. The name is believed to have Norman origins.

Notable Buffets include:
 David Buffett (born 1942), the current Chief Minister of Norfolk Island, Australia
 George D. Buffett (1928–2012), American politician
 Howard Buffett (1903–1964), American politician, father of Warren Buffett
 Howard Graham Buffett (born 1954), son of Warren Buffett
 Howard Warren Buffett (born 1983), son of Howard Graham Buffett and grandson of Warren Buffett
 Ivens Buffett, Australian politician
 Jimmy Buffett (born 1946), American musician
 Peter Buffett (born 1958), musician, son of Warren Buffett
 Susan Buffett (1932–2004), wife of Warren Buffett
 Warren Buffett (born 1930), American investor and CEO of Berkshire Hathaway

References

Surnames of English origin
Anglo-Norman families
Surnames of Norman origin